Barbara Brown (August 21, 1941 – April 1969) was an American athlete. She competed in the women's high jump at the 1960 Summer Olympics.

References

External links
 

1941 births
1969 deaths
Athletes (track and field) at the 1960 Summer Olympics
American female high jumpers
Olympic track and field athletes of the United States
Place of birth missing
20th-century American women